Corvette lieutenant is a rank in some navies, especially those of Spain and Latin America, roughly equivalent to a Royal Navy acting sub-lieutenant or a US Navy ensign.

Corvette lieutenants' insignia

See also
 Corvette
 Corvette captain

References

Naval ranks